Europium halide is a compound of the rare earth metal europium and a halogen.  The following compounds are known.

europium(II) fluoride
Europium(III) fluoride
Europium(II) chloride
Europium(III) chloride
Europium(II) bromide
Europium(III) bromide
Europium(II) iodide
Europium(III) iodide